Amor de Abril is a 1988 Venezuelan telenovela developed by Édgar Mejías for  Venevisión. The telenovela was distributed internationally by Venevisión International and starred Aixa Moreno and Eduardo Serrano as the main protagonists.

Plot
Amor de Abril tells the story of Abril Santaella who faces her past after meeting Gilberto Russian, the re encounter with her family, her powerful father Nicolas Santaella and the thing she had given up on: love. The story takes place in the environment of journalism, financial world while involving three families: the Santaellas, Anduezas and Duartes. Leonardo Duarte is responsible for a tragedy in which Abril is involved. But is the question becomes what is Leonardo's connection with the Santaella family before he met Abril? What is his purpose? And will Abril be able to give up the love of her life because he hates her family? Who will win when love and hate are involved?.

Cast
Aixa Moreno as Abril Santaella
Eduardo Serrano as Leonardo Duarte
Rafael Briceño as Nicolás Santaella
Liliana Durán
Eva Moreno
Mirella Larotonda
Luis Gerardo Núñez
Luis Gerónimo Abreu
Martha Pabón
Alejo Felipe
Hector Monteverde
Sandra Bruzon

References

External links

1988 telenovelas
Venevisión telenovelas
Venezuelan telenovelas
Spanish-language telenovelas
1988 Venezuelan television series debuts
1988 Venezuelan television series endings
Television shows set in Venezuela